Behind the Camera: The Unauthorized Story of Charlie's Angels is a 2004 American made-for-television drama film, made by NBC, documenting the success of the series Charlie's Angels, as well as the interpersonal conflicts that occurred among its staff and cast.

Cast
 Christina Chambers as Jaclyn Smith
 Tricia Helfer as Farrah Fawcett-Majors
 Lauren Stamile as Kate Jackson
 Ben Browder as Lee Majors
 Dan Castellaneta as Aaron Spelling
 Dan Lauria as Fred Silverman
 Michael Tomlinson as Barney Rosenzweig
 Wallace Langham as Jay Bernstein
 Orson Bean as the voice of John Forsythe

References

External links
 

2004 television films
2004 films
American films based on actual events
NBC network original films
Charlie's Angels (franchise)
Biographical films about actors
Films directed by Francine McDougall
2000s English-language films